Heera Dom was a Bhojpuri poet who contributed to Dalit Literature. He is credited with creating the first poem about the Dalits. The poem was Acchut Kee Shiqayat, which was printed in the "Saraswati" published in Allahabad in 1914.

Life 
He was a Dalit poet from the Domra or Dom caste which is one of the lowest ranked castes in Hindu caste system. He was born in 1885 in Danapur in Bihar.
Some scholars also claim that he was from Varanasi.

"Acchut Kee Shiqayat"
"Acchut ki Shiqayat" (Bhojpuri: 𑂃𑂓𑂳𑂞 𑂍𑂵 𑂮𑂱𑂍𑂰𑂉𑂞; IAST: achūt kī śikayat; transl. The compliant of an Untouchable) is written in Bhojpuri. It was published in the Hindi magazine Saraswati in 1914 from Allahabad. In this poem, Dom has expressed the trauma of his Dom community in literary form.

The first and second stanza of the poem are as follows:

References 

1885 births
Year of death missing
Bhojpuri-language writers
Dalit people
Indian male poets